Pityrodia puberula is a flowering plant in the mint family Lamiaceae and is endemic to Arnhem Land in the Northern Territory. It is a straggling shrub with narrow, hairy leaves arranged in four rows and off-white, bell-like flowers with dark purple streaks.

Description
The lower middle lobe is larger than the others. The outer part of the petal tube and lobes are hairy and there is a dense hairy ring below the stamens. The four stamens extend slightly beyond the end of the tube, the lower pair slightly longer than the other one.

Taxonomy and naming
Pityrodia puberula was first formally described in 1979 by Ahmad Abid Munir from a specimen collected near Mount Cahill in Arnhem Land. The description was published in Journal of the Adelaide Botanic Gardens.

Distribution
This pityrodia occurs in Arnhem Land including in the Kakadu National Park and Nitmiluk National Park .

Conservation
Pityrodia puberula is classified as "least concern" under the Territory Parks and Wildlife Conservation Act 2000.

References

puberula
Plants described in 1979
Flora of the Northern Territory